Sleeping Beauty is a classic fairy tale.

Sleeping Beauty or variant, may also refer to:

Film
 The Sleeping Beauty (1930 film), a Soviet film directed by Georgi Vasilyev and Sergei Vasilyev
 The Sleeping Beauty (1935 film), an American cartoon in the Puppetoon series by George Pal, included in The Puppetoon Movie
 Sleeping Beauty (1942 film), an Italian film
 Sleeping Beauty (1959 film), an American animated film from Walt Disney Pictures
 Aurora (Disney), the title character of the Disney film
 Sleeping Beauty (franchise), a Disney media franchise that began in 1959 with the release of Sleeping Beauty
 Sleeping Beauty (1955 film), a 1955 West German film directed by Fritz Genschow
 Sleeping Beauty (1973 film) or Some Call It Loving, a drama by James B. Harris
 Sleeping Beauty (1987 film), a film starring Tahnee Welch
 Sleeping Beauties (film), a 1999 American comedy film
 Sleeping Beauty (2010 film), a film by Catherine Breillat
 Sleeping Beauty (2011 film), an Australian film starring Emily Browning
 Sleeping Beauty (2014 film), an American film directed by Casper Van Dien

Literature
 "The Day-Dream", an 1842 poem by Alfred Tennyson, a reworking of his 1830 poem "The Sleeping Beauty"
 The Sleeping Beauty (Taylor novel), a 1953 novel by the English writer Elizabeth Taylor
 "Sleeping Beauty" (short story), a 1957 science fiction short story by Arthur C. Clarke
 Sleeping Beauty (novel), a 1973 novel by Ross Macdonald
 The Sleeping Beauty Quartet, four erotic novels (1983–2015) by Anne Rice writing under the pseudonym A. N. Roquelaure
 The Sleeping Beauty (novel), a 2010 novel by Mercedes Lackey
 Sleeping Beauties (novel), a 2017 novel by Stephen King and Owen King
 Sleeping Beauty, a 2004 Phillip Margolin novel

Music and theatre

Operas
 La belle au bois dormant (Carafa), by Michele Carafa, 1825
 La belle au bois dormant (Lecocq), by Charles Lecocq, 1900
 Dornröschen (The Sleeping Beauty), by Humperdinck, 1902
 La bella dormente nel bosco, by Respighi, 1922

Other stage works
 The Sleeping Beauty in the Wood, an extravaganza by James Planché, 1840
 The Sleeping Beauty (ballet), a ballet by Tchaikovsky, originally choreographed by Marius Petipa, 1889
 Prinsessa Ruusunen (Sleeping Beauty), a ballet by Erkki Melartin, 1904

Albums
 Sleeping Beauty (Sun Ra album) or the title song, 1979
 The Sleeping Beauty (Live in Israel) or the title song (see below), by Tiamat, 1994

Songs
 "Sleeping Beauty" (song), by Divinyls, 1985
 "Sleeping Beauty", by Brotherhood of Man from Higher Than High
 "Sleeping Beauty", by Diaura from Focus
 "Sleeping Beauty", by Lene Lovich from Stateless
 "Sleeping Beauty", by A Perfect Circle from Mer de Noms
 "Sleeping Beauty", by Perfume from Level3
 "The Sleeping Beauty", by Tiamat from Clouds

Science
 Kleine–Levin syndrome or Sleeping Beauty syndrome, a neurological disorder
 Nicole Delien (born 1995), woman that suffers from Kleine-Levin syndrome and is called "Sleeping Beauty" in the media
 Oxalis corniculata or Sleeping Beauty, a herbaceous plant
 Somnophilia or Sleeping Beauty syndrome, a paraphilia
 Sleeping Beauty (paper with delayed recognition)
 Sleeping Beauty Galaxy or Black Eye Galaxy
 Sleeping Beauty transposon system, a genetic tool for gene discovery and gene transfer

Television
 "Sleeping Beauty" (Faerie Tale Theatre), an episode of Faerie Tale Theatre
 "The Sleeping Beauty" (The O.C.), an episode of The O.C.
 "Sleeping Beauty", an episode of Thomas the Tank Engine and Friends

Other uses
Sleeping Beauty (Cheech & Chong album), a 1976 comedy album by Cheech and Chong
Sleeping Beauty (canoe), a WWII submersible electric-powered canoe for a frogman to ride
The Sleeping Beauty (wax figure), a wax figure at Madame Tussauds in London
Sleeping Beauty, Kalinga, a mountain in the Philippines
Sleeping Beauty Castle, a structure at Disneyland Park and Hong Kong Disneyland Park
Sleeping Beauty Mountain Provincial Park, British Columbia, Canada
Sleeping Beauty Peak, a mountain in Washington state, U.S.
Sleeping Beauty Rock, Taiwan
La Bella Durmiente, Peru (Spanish for "Sleeping Beauty"), a mountain
Sleeping Beauty problem, a puzzle in probability
Dornröschen (Sussmann-Hellborn), a sculpture ("Sleeping Beauty")
Sleeping Beauty, a neologism coined by linguist Ghil'ad Zuckermann as an alternative to extinct language
Sleeping Beauty, a legend in the Western Mountains region of Yunnan, China
Francys Arsentiev (1958–1998), American mountaineer whose corpse on Mount Everest was nicknamed "Sleeping Beauty"

See also

 
 
 Sleeping Princess (film), a 2010 Turkish film written and directed by Çağan Irmak